The Oakland Ballet Company is a non-profit ballet company based in Oakland, California.  OBC was founded in 1965 by Ronn Guidi, an Oakland native, and gained international recognition through its historical reconstructions of ballets from the legendary Ballets Russes of Serge Diaghilev; the mounting of classic works of Americana; and the creation of innovative contemporary choreography.

Guidi founded Oakland Ballet Company on the same the principles that inspired the legendary dance troupe of Ballets Russes. Formed in Paris in the early 20th century under impresario Sergei Diaghilev, the Ballets Russes went on to redefine the art of ballet. Guidi studied under Raoul Pausé for many years, himself a former student of Ballets Russes dancer and choreographer Adolf Bolm, and thus inherited the Ballets Russes tradition of fusing classical training with unrestrained choreographic possibilities.

Noted revivals by Oakland Ballet include works by renowned choreographers Kurt Jooss, Michel Fokine, Charles Weidman, and Antony Tudor and the first re-staging of works by Bronislava Nijinska in the United States. Championing American masterpieces as well, Oakland Ballet has presented Eugene Loring's "Billy the Kid", Ruthanna Boris's "Cakewalk", and Agnes de Mille's "Fall River Legend". Along with Guidi's own repertoire of choreography, Oakland Ballet has produced celebrated works by local choreographers such as Val Caniparoli, Carlos Carvajal, Margaret Jenkins, Alonzo King, Michael Lowe, Robert Moses, and Amy Seiwert, among others.

In 2000, Oakland Ballet ushered in a new era with a new Artist Director, celebrated Dance Theatre of Harlem dancer, Karen Brown. Brown brought a renewed focus to the production of ballets by local and contemporary choreographers while continuing the company’s commitment to performing great classical works. In 2007 OBC celebrated the return of founding Artistic Director, Ronn Guidi. Mr. Guidi retired for the final time in 2008 and Oakland Ballet continued to present productions under the direction of guest Artistic Directors through the spring of 2010.

In 2010, the company welcomed internationally acclaimed choreographer and director Graham Lustig as Artistic Director. Lustig’s career as a dancer, artistic director, and choreographer parallels OBC’s tradition of presenting historically vibrant work while championing new choreography.

Under Lustig’s leadership, the Oakland Ballet has rekindled its commitment to serving the local community by producing ballet that is vibrant in its artistic vision and draws on the Bay Area’s great talent. Oakland Ballet’s longtime collaboration with Michael Morgan, Music Director and Conductor of Oakland East Bay Symphony, continues to be a hallmark of the annual performance of Graham Lustig’s "The Nutcracker" at the Paramount Theatre.

Since his appointment as Artistic Director of Oakland Ballet Company in 2010, Lustig has presented five seasons of his Nutcracker and three spring repertory productions, Forwards! (2011), Diaghilev Imagery (2013), and Oakland-esque (2014), with a focus on commissioned works by esteemed Bay Area choreographers. Lustig’s ballet Infinitum was included in the West Wave Dance Festival (2011) and he initiated Oakland Ballet Company’s annual summer Ballet Boot Camp, a two-week dance and choreography workshop now in its fifth year, as well as ongoing ballet training opportunities at The Academy at Oakland Ballet Company. Lustig also been instrumental in reviving Oakland Ballet’s role in arts education in the East Bay, establishing OBC’s current “Discover Dance” community outreach program.

Repertoire

References

External links
 Oakland Ballet Company

Ballet companies in the United States
1961 establishments in California
Performing groups established in 1961
Organizations based in Oakland, California
Dance in California
Non-profit organizations based in California